Israel Smith (April 4, 1759 – December 2, 1810) was an American lawyer and politician. He held a wide variety of positions in the state of Vermont, including as a member of the United States House of Representatives, a member of the United States Senate, the fourth governor of Vermont.

Early life
Smith was born in Suffield in the Colony of Connecticut, where he spent his childhood. He studied at Yale University and graduated in 1781. He studied law with his brother Noah Smith, and was admitted to the bar. He began his law practice in Rupert, Vermont.

He married Abiah Douglass (1767-1836), and they had two children, William (1785-1822) and Horace (1787-1790).  After Israel Smith's death Abiah married Colonel William C. Harrington, who became an attorney in Burlington, Vermont.

Career
Smith began his political career in 1785 when he served as a member of the Vermont House of Representatives. He served in the Vermont House again from 1788 to 1791. During this period, he was active in solving Vermont's boundary disputes with other states and served as a delegate to the Vermont Constitutional Convention, at which Vermont ratified the American Constitution. By 1790 Smith had moved to Rutland, Vermont.

When Vermont became a state in 1791, Smith ran for Vermont's seat in the United States House of Representatives. In a bitterly fought election between Smith, Matthew Lyon and Isaac Tichenor, Smith received second place, 35% of the vote in the first round, but won the runoff against Lyon. Smith represented Vermont's 1st District in the U.S. House from 1791 to 1797. In 1792 and 1794, Lyon unsuccessfully ran against Smith, but in 1796 Smith was defeated by Lyon. By this time, Smith had become a member of the Democratic-Republican Party.

In 1797, Smith again briefly served in the Vermont State House. He became Chief Justice of the Vermont Supreme Court in 1797, but resigned the following year. In 1800, Smith was reelected to the United States House of Representatives, where he served until 1802.

In 1802, Smith was elected to the United States Senate from Vermont, and served in the Senate from 1803 to 1807. In 1807 he successfully ran against one of his old political rivals, Isaac Tichenor, for governor. Tichenor had served as governor for a decade. Smith resigned from the Senate and served as Governor of Vermont from 1807 to 1808, when he was defeated for reelection by Tichenor. Smith served as Vermont's fourth Governor.

Death and legacy
After leaving the governorship, Smith resumed practicing law in Rutland. He became ill and died in Rutland. He was interred at West Street Cemetery in Rutland. His home in Rutland has been preserved.

References

External links
 

 Israel Smith biography at National Governors Association
 
 govtrack.us
 A Guide to the Papers of Vermont's Governors
 Rutland Historical Society
 Vermont: The Official State Website

Governors of Vermont
United States senators from Vermont
Members of the Vermont House of Representatives
1759 births
1810 deaths
People from Rupert, Vermont
Yale University alumni
Democratic-Republican Party United States senators
Vermont lawyers
Justices of the Vermont Supreme Court
Burials in Vermont
Democratic-Republican Party members of the United States House of Representatives from Vermont
Democratic-Republican Party state governors of the United States
19th-century American lawyers